There have been three baronetcies created for persons with the surname Wells, all in the Baronetage of the United Kingdom. Two of the creations are extinct.
The Wells baronetcy of Upper Grosvenor Street in the County of London, was created in the Baronetage of the United Kingdom on 11 May 1883 for the prominent surgeon Thomas Spencer Wells. The title became extinct on the death of the second Baronet in 1906.
The Wells baronetcy of Felmersham in the County of Bedford, was created in the Baronetage of the United Kingdom on 21 January 1944 for Richard Wells, who represented Bedford in the House of Commons as a Unionist from 1922 to 1945. As of 2007 the title is held by his grandson, the third Baronet, who succeeded his father in 1996.
The Wells baronetcy of Hove in the County of Sussex, was created in the Baronetage of the United Kingdom on 30 November 1948 for Frederick Wells, Lord Mayor of London from 1947 to 1948. The title became extinct on his death in 1966.

Wells baronets of Upper Grosvenor Street (1883)
Sir Thomas Spencer Wells, 1st Baronet (1818–1898)
Sir Arthur Spencer Wells, 2nd Baronet (1866–1906)

Wells baronets of Felmersham (1944)
Sir (Sydney) Richard Wells, 1st Baronet (1879–1956)
Sir Charles Maltby Wells, 2nd Baronet (1908–1996)
Sir Christopher Charles Wells, 3rd Baronet (born 1936)

Wells baronets of Hove (1948)
Sir Frederick Michael Wells, 1st Baronet (1884–1966)

Notes

References
Kidd, Charles, Williamson, David (editors). Debrett's Peerage and Baronetage (1990 edition). New York: St Martin's Press, 1990, 

Baronetcies in the Baronetage of the United Kingdom
Extinct baronetcies in the Baronetage of the United Kingdom